Maeng Se-chang (born November 13, 1991) is a South Korean actor and singer. Maeng started his career as a child actor. In 2011, he revealed his hidden ambitions as a singer. In July 2011, he debuted as the leader of the ballad group BoM with a single album "Without You." However, BoM was disbanded in March 2013.

Filmography

Film

Television series

Variety show

Discography

Awards and nominations

References

External links 
 
 
 
 
 Maeng Se-chang at Flight Entertainment  
 
 
 
 
 

1991 births
Living people
South Korean male television actors
South Korean male film actors
Kookmin University alumni